The Megapolis Audio Festival (aka MEGAPOLIS) is a weekend-long event dedicated to the art of sound and to do-it-yourself (DIY) culture. The festival serves as a forum for artists, documentarians, musicians, and fans to come together to share secrets on producing and presenting challenging audio works online, on-air, and on the stage. Traveling to a new city each year to connect artists from around the world with local artists and arts organizations, MEGAPOLIS remains an affordable event where people of all ages can educate and inspire each other to hear the world differently.

MEGAPOLIS was founded in 2008 by Justin Grotelueschen (managing director) and Nick van der Kolk (of Love and Radio) and is administered by a new team of organizers each year.

The name Megapolis is a variation of megalopolis, referring originally to the Northeast megalopolis of the United States and to the cultural influence of an urban environment on the soundscape.

Past festivals

2009
The inaugural MEGAPOLIS Audio Festival kicked off in Cambridge, Massachusetts, starting on April 24, 2009, at the Massasoit Elks Lodge and continuing April 25 and 26 at the Pierre Menard Gallery, with some events in Boston. Featured events included:

 A performance by Gregory Whitehead, radio theatre legend
 An audio documentary listening room from the Third Coast International Audio Festival
 An opening night of intense musics led by The Lothars, theremin-infused psych rock from Boston, along with a typewriter orchestra, a man manipulating the radio waves with a steering wheel, and a demonstration of culinary auditory delights

Over 40 artists from across North America and from countries beyond combined with local artists to perform, install works, and conduct workshops and tours under the general theme of the megapolis, including:

 workshops for building your own instruments and contact microphones
 an audio-making slumber party
 a bicycle-powered 8-track player
 a clandestine audio tour of an insane asylum
 a presentation on the cross-pollination of poetry and sound

Co-sponsored Festival events included a media archaeology of Boston at the Carpenter Center at Harvard University, a live cello score of a museum construction at the Axiom Gallery in Jamaica Plain, Massachusetts, and a live performance of the WNYC science program Radio Lab at the Museum of Science in Boston.

2010
The second MEGAPOLIS occurred in Baltimore, Maryland starting on May 14 at the Windup Space and continued May 15 and 16 starting at the Hexagon Gallery. The 2010 event featured several high-profile artists including:

 Felix Kubin, sci-fi music and radio visionary from Germany
 Lucky Dragons, psychedelic electronic artists from Los Angeles
 David Kestenbaum, science and economics correspondent for NPR

Over 60 artists from around the world interpreted the festival theme of travel during:

 audio scavenger hunts with iPhones and low-wattage transmitters
 collaborative sound-making performances using contact mics attached to parachutes and knitting needles
 1-800-numbers that attendees could call that dealt out exercises and suggestions designed to elicit aural experiences
 booths where participants could retell their nightmares and strain to hear to tiny sounds
 existentialist theatrical tours led by gnomes who encounter deviant characters along a path to 'enlightenment'
 audio transmissions between live-mic'd venues using FM and shortwave radio

2013
The third MEGAPOLIS Audio Festival took place in New York City, from April 19–21, 2013, with most events happening in and around the New School. More than 100 artists participated including:

 Leif Elggren
 Mountains (Thrill Jockey records)
 Flutronix
 Kitchen Sisters (NPR)

Artists loosely interpreted the festival theme of tourism through more than 60 events such as:
 “noise” karaoke, where participants sing hit songs as the DJ mangles their vocals through live processing
 foley effect workshop recording food items then sampled and mixed live in a dance music tent
 helmet that used bone conduction to “hear” sounds
 experimental one-man theatre backed by suffocating noise music and harrowing spoken word
 global experiments in musical improvisation using telecommunications networks

2015
The fourth MEGAPOLIS  was the first held outside the Northeast megalopolis, instead popping up within the Northern California megaregion. This event kicked off at The LAB in San Francisco CA on July 5, 2015, continuing the 6th at various venues in Oakland before landing at the Omni Commons on the 7th. Some of the artists featured that weekend:
 Roman Mars, executive producer of highly acclaimed podcast 99% Invisible
 Matmos, experimental electronic music duo; collaborated on albums with Icelandic musician Björk
 Al Letson, Peabody-award-winning radio host, poet, playwright, and actor 
 Doseone, a poet, rapper, singer, painter, producer, and member of cLOUDDEAD, anticon, and more
 Fantastic Negrito, winner of NPR's 2015 Tiny Desk Concert Contest
 Kevin Blechdom (Blectum From Blechdom), a Bay Area experimental electronic musician self-dubbed as an avenging angel of pop music
 Song Exploder, a podcast where artists deconstruct their songs from the inside out
 Gamelan X, ensemble that remixes the ritual of a Balinese procession with a decidedly west coast twist

The theme of the 2015 MEGAPOLIS Festival was the frontier and featured 30 events including:
 an immersive installation of sound-emitting light bulbs that react to your presence
 interactive presentations on scientific innovations in music and storytelling through conscious thought control as well as infrasound imperceptible to the human ear
 an exercise in rapid prototyping using the basics of design thinking to introduce the idea of iterative problem solving for artists
 hacking and soldering workshops to create Moldover's Light-Theremin CD cases, low-wattage radio transmitters, homemade synthesizers, and manipulated game controllers
 yoga together with drone music

References

External links
 

Arts festivals in the United States
DIY culture